

References 

Indian filmographies